The Battle of Staffarda took place on 18 August 1690 during the Nine Years' War in Piedmont, Northern Italy.  The engagement was the first major battle of the Nine Years' War in Italy since Victor Amadeus II of Savoy joined the Grand Alliance against Louis XIV of France earlier that year. 

A French force of around 12,000 under Nicolas Catinat defeated a Savoyard army of 18,000 led by Victor Amadeus and the Imperial general Prince Eugène of Savoy. Victory allowed Catinat to over-run most of Piedmont but he was unable to take the capital of Turin due to sickness, lack of men and supply problems.

Background
By 1690, the Nine Years' War was in its third year. The greater part of the forces involved on both sides was engaged in the Spanish Netherlands where the Dutch, with considerable English and a little Spanish help, concentrated their war effort. Along the Rhine – where ultimately the war would prove no more decisive than the Netherlands' campaign – the German Princes provided the bulk of the troops to face France. The one area where the Allies had great hopes of forcing – " … a door … into France, big enough … for us to get in at", was Italy.

The territories of Victor Amadeus II, Duke of Savoy, split into several distinct areas: the County of Nice, the Duchy of Savoy, the Duchy of Aosta, and the Principality of Piedmont. Nice occupied the region on the Mediterranean where the Alps meet the sea; Savoy occupied the region where the Alps border the French province of Dauphiné; and Piedmont, which also contained the capital city of Turin and was the most important and populous region, linked the mountains to the Po valley.

Like his predecessors, Louis XIV of France viewed the Savoyard state as a French dependency and despite Victor Amadeus' determination to maintain his independence, he was often compelled to follow his wishes. Even before the outbreak of the war, the French had a significant military presence in Piedmont with the control of two imposing fortresses: Pinerolo, to the west, annexed by France fifty years earlier in defiance of the 1631 Treaty of Cherasco; and to the east in Duchy of Montferrat, the fortress of Casale, acquired in 1681 after Ferdinand Charles, Duke of Mantua, surrendered it to Louis XIV in exchange for an initial payment of 1,000,000 livres and an annual subsidy of 60,000 livres.

Prelude

At the beginning of 1690, Victor Amadeus had yet to openly join the war; although his small army totalled only 8,000 men,  Louis XIV understood that he had to retain Savoy in the French orbit. Ignoring Amadeus's own sovereign interests, the French sought guarantees and made their demands on the Duke: Amadeus was either to send 2,000 infantry and three dragoon regiments to assist French forces in the Spanish Netherlands – nearly half his army – or, he was to unite them with Nicolas Catinat's forces for an attack on the Spanish-ruled Duchy of Milan; he was also to hand over to Catinat the citadel of Turin and, further down the Po River, Verrua. If he did not do so he would, in Louvois' words, "be punished in such a manner that he remembers it for the rest of his life."

French demands were nothing less than an attack on Savoyard independence, and the intimidation ultimately proved counter-productive. In the early summer of 1690 Amadeus realised he had to stand up to France and he began to look towards the Grand Alliance. But he had conditions. Amadeus reiterated his family claim to the Duchy of Montferrat, over which the House of Savoy was in perennial dispute with the Duke of Mantua, stipulating the razing of Casale as the minimum he would accept in this region; he also demanded the reacquisition of Pinerolo as the sine qua non of Savoyard entry into the war on the Allied side, and sought to take over at least one French place in Dauphiné. Amadeus's hectic preparations for war and his negotiations for financial assistance from England and Spain, were followed by a declaration of war against France on 4 June.

Battle

In July Catinat took command of French forces in Piedmont, totalling some 12,000 men, while Victor Amadeus received 10,000 Spanish reinforcements from Milan, and was also promised 5,000 Imperial troops led by his cousin, Prince Eugene of Savoy. Additionally, Amadeus's Protestant community, the Vaudois, who had previously suffered religious persecution from Louis XIV and Amadeus alike, had since become reconciled with their Duke, and took up arms in defence of their valleys. Little quarter was asked or given when fighting the French.

Determined to punish Amadeus, Louis XIV had ordered Catinat to use his force to burn and tax (put under contribution) large tracts of  parts of Savoy and the Plain of Piedmont – attempts by local peasants to retaliate were met by hanging anyone who was found carrying arms. However, the Marquis de Feuquieres, sent by Catinat with 1,200 troops to Luserna, suffered a major setback and was forced to abandon the town with the loss of some 600 men.

While Catinat's army manoeuvred on the Piedmontese plain Marquis de Saint-Ruth took most of the exposed Duchy of Savoy, routing the Savoyard forces; only the great fortress of Montmélian, less than 60 km north of Grenoble, remained in ducal hands. Although Savoy was far less important than Piedmont, its loss was a major setback for the Grand Alliance, making an invasion of France now much less likely. In a desperate attempt to halt the destruction and intimidation Amadeus – against the advice of Eugene – insisted on engaging the French with his own and Spanish troops. Believing that Feuquieres was lost, and anxious to catch the French whilst they were weak, Amadeus left his camp at Villafranca with the intention of attacking and surrounding Catinat.

Catinat left his camp at Cavour and marched south with the intention of taking Saluzzo; when Amadeus moved to stop him, the result was the engagement at the abbey of Staffarda on 18 August. Marshes and hedges impeded movement on the battlefield and sheltered the Savoyard line, but French troops eventually broke the Savoyard army. Only Prince Eugene's command of the Savoyard cavalry and his conduct in retreat saved the Allied army from disaster. Amadeus suffered 2,800 casualties and 1,200 prisoners; he also lost 11 of his 12 cannon. Catinat's casualties amount to some 2,000 troops.

Aftermath
Catinat subsequently took Saluzzo, Savigliano and Fossano,  levying supplies and taxes from the occupied areas; towns that refused to pay, like Ceresole and Autrive were looted. When Imperial troops finally arrived in Piedmont little could be achieved, allegedly due to Spanish reluctance to support Victor Amadeus, their long-time rival for dominance in Northern Italy, with Prince Eugene claiming "they want to do absolutely nothing." Instead, he confined himself to small raids carried out by his cavalry, many of whom were used to the brutality of the Turkish wars; during one such episode in September 1690, they reportedly castrated 200 French prisoners before killing them.

Catinat proceeded to Susa, a vital fortress controlling communications with Briançon in the Dauphiné, opening trenches there on 11 November. The stronghold capitulated two days later, but hopes of taking Turin then capturing the Asti region and south-east Piedmont in order to link up with Casale had to be scaled back due to supply and communication problems, manning shortages, and sickness within the army. Unable to live off the resources of a devastated Piedmont, the French took up winter quarters in Savoy, the Dauphiné, and Provence. The Imperial troops based themselves in Montferrat, much to the consternation of its pro-French ruler, the Duke of Mantua.

References

Sources
 
 
 
 
McKay, Derek & Scott, H. M (1984). The Rise of the Great Powers 1648–1815. Longman. 
  
 

Battles involving Savoy
1690 in Italy
1690 in France
Battles of the Nine Years' War
Battles involving France
Battles involving Spain
Battles involving Austria
Conflicts in 1690
History of Piedmont